Jacqueline Voll (born October 18, 1987 in Dordrecht) is a Dutch former competitive figure skater. She is the 2007 Dutch silver medalist and 2008 bronze medalist. She currently resides in Hendrik-Ido-Ambacht.

Results

J = Junior

References
 
 2008 Dutch Nationals

External links
 Tracings.net profile

1987 births
Living people
Dutch female single skaters
Sportspeople from Dordrecht
Sportspeople from Hendrik-Ido-Ambacht